Dominican (Dominica) passports are issued to citizens of Dominica for international travel. The passport is a CARICOM passport as Dominica is a member of the Caribbean Community. The Dominican government began issuing biometric passports to its citizens on 19 July 2021, having spent $13 million upgrading its passport systems to improve national security across its borders.

Physical appearance
The Dominican passport shares the common design standards of CARICOM passports. The cover is dark blue for civilians with the country's coat of arms and official name, as well as the CARICOM logo, on the front cover.

Visa requirements
 Dominican passport holders enjoy visa-free or visa on arrival access (including eTAs) to 145 countries and territories, ranking the Dominican passport 34th in the world in terms of travel freedom (tied with the Taiwanese passport) according to the Henley Passport Index. Passport holders may travel to the United Kingdom and the Schengen Area with relative ease and without challenging visa requirements.

See also
 Visa requirements for Dominica citizens
 Dominican passport information on PRADO
 Henley Passport Index
 Caribbean passport

References 

 List of nationals who do need a visa to visit the UK .
 List of countries whose passport holders do not require visas to enter Ireland .

External links 
  of the Commonwealth of Dominica Immigration Department
 Immigration, Commonwealth of Dominica Police Force
 Council Decision 7111/15 - Council of the European Union Decision on the signing and provisional application of the Agreement between the European Community and Commonwealth of Dominica on the short-stay visa waiver

Dominica, Commonwealth of
Passport